Charles Drain may refer to:
Charles Drain (pioneer) (1816–1894), American pioneer and founder of the town of Drain, Oregon
Charles Drain (politician) (1913–1991), American-born Canadian politician

See also
Drain (surname)